Spilomicrus is a genus of hymenopterans in the family Diapriidae.

North American species

 Spilomicrus abnormis Marshall, 1868 g
 Spilomicrus acuminatus (Herrich-Schäffer, 1838) g
 Spilomicrus annulicornis Kieffer, 1911 g
 Spilomicrus antennatus (Jurine, 1807) g
 Spilomicrus apterygus (Kieffer, 1904) g
 Spilomicrus autumnalis Kieffer, 1911 g
 Spilomicrus barbatus Szabo, 1983 g
 Spilomicrus barnesi Early & Horning, 1978 c g
 Spilomicrus basalyformis Marshall, 1868 g
 Spilomicrus bipunctatus Kieffer, 1911 g
 Spilomicrus carinatus Kieffer, 1911 g
 Spilomicrus carolae Early, 1980 c g
 Spilomicrus clavatus (Herrich-Schäffer, 1838) g
 Spilomicrus compressus Thomson, 1859 g
 Spilomicrus crassiclavis Kieffer, 1911 g
 Spilomicrus crassipes Kieffer, 1911 g
 Spilomicrus cursor Kieffer, 1911 g
 Spilomicrus flavipes Thomson, 1859 g
 Spilomicrus formosus Jansson, 1942 g
 Spilomicrus gracilicornis Kieffer, 1911 g
 Spilomicrus hemipterus Marshall, 1868 g
 Spilomicrus inaequalis Tomsik, 1947 g
 Spilomicrus integer Thomson, 1858 g
 Spilomicrus kaszabi Szabo, 1977 g
 Spilomicrus lubomasneri g
 Spilomicrus lusitanicus (Kieffer, 1910) g
 Spilomicrus major Vollenhoven, 1879 g
 Spilomicrus mediofurcatus Szabo, 1983 g
 Spilomicrus modestus Tomsik, 1947 g
 Spilomicrus moniliatus (Herrich-Schäffer, 1838) g
 Spilomicrus niger (Kieffer, 1910) g
 Spilomicrus nigriclavis Marshall, 1868 g
 Spilomicrus noctiger Szabo, 1977 g
 Spilomicrus notaulus g
 Spilomicrus nottoni g
 Spilomicrus obtusus (Herrich-Schäffer, 1838) g
 Spilomicrus pelion Nixon, 1980 g
 Spilomicrus pilgrimi Early, 1978 c g
 Spilomicrus pillicornis Szabo, 1977 g
 Spilomicrus procerus (Haliday, 1857) g
 Spilomicrus pseudocursor Szabo, 1974 g
 Spilomicrus punctatus Kozlov, 1978 g
 Spilomicrus quinquepunctatus (Szabo, 1961) g
 Spilomicrus radialis (Herrich-Schäffer, 1838) g
 Spilomicrus rufitarsis Kieffer, 1911 g
 Spilomicrus rufithorax (Kieffer, 1910) g
 Spilomicrus sanbornei Masner, 1991 g
 Spilomicrus simplex Tomsik, 1947 g
 Spilomicrus stigmaticalis Westwood, 1832 g
 Spilomicrus striatifoveatus Szabo, 1960 g
 Spilomicrus subarmatus Kieffer, 1911 g
 Spilomicrus szelenyii Szabo, 1977 g
 Spilomicrus thomsoni Kieffer, 1911 g
 Spilomicrus varipes (Herrich-Schäffer, 1838) g

Data sources: i = ITIS, c = Catalogue of Life, g = GBIF, b = Bugguide.net

References

Further reading

External links

 

Parasitic wasps
Parasitica
Diapriidae